Nicholas "Little Nick" Corozzo (born March 17, 1940) is an American New York mobster who is a captain in the Gambino crime family.

Biography

Nicholas Corozzo was born at 1825 Pitkin Avenue in the Brownsville neighborhood of Brooklyn. Nicholas Corozzo's first headquarters was located in a small candy store on the corner of Eastern Pkwy & Atlantic Ave. in the Ocean Hill section of Brooklyn, known as "The Hill" to his crew members. He later opened a social club next to the candy store which became his new headquarters. Corozzo later moved his headquarters to the Canarsie section of Brooklyn. Nicholas is the older brother of alleged reputed Gambino consigliere Joseph "Jo Jo" Corozzo as well as twin brothers Blaise Corozzo, a Gambino soldier, and Anthony Corozzo who is an associate of the Gambino crime family. Anthony Corozzo is a longtime parishioner of Our Lady of Loreto Church located at the corner of Pacific St. & Sackman St. in Brownsville, Brooklyn where he regularly attended Sunday mass. Anthony Corozzo along with his lifelong friend and Gambino crime family associate Dominick Mondelli aka Donny Mondelli, were well known for organizing neighborhood reunions and charitable events for the church for decades. Anthony died on April 17, 2020. Nicholas Corozzo is the uncle of Joseph Corozzo Jr, a high-profile New York defense attorney. Nicholas' daughter, Bernadette, is married to Gambino associate Vincent Dragonetti. Prior to Corozzo's incarceration, he lived in Bellmore, Long Island. He stands at 5′5" tall and weighs approximately 170 pounds.

Ruling Panel

During the early 1980s, Nicholas Corozzo was a bitter rival of Gambino captain John Gotti. When Gotti became boss in 1985, he declined to promote Corozzo to captain. However, since Corozzo was such a good earner for the family, Gotti did not want to get rid of him. In turn, Corozzo professed loyalty to Gotti. It was only after Gotti went to prison in 1992 that Corozzo was finally promoted to captain, along with Gambino soldier Leonard "Lenny" DiMaria. With Gotti in prison, Corozzo, DiMaria, and Nicholas' brother Joseph, now the alleged  consigliere, formed a ruling panel that unofficially ran the Gambino family. In the mid 1990s, Corozzo was elevated to serve on the ruling panel.

In 1996, Corozzo allegedly ordered the murder of Lucchese crime family associate Robert Arena. Arena had allegedly murdered Anthony Placido, a member of Corozzo's crew, and had failed to return some stolen marijuana to a drug dealer. On June 26, 1996, the Gambino gunmen found Arena driving with Thomas Maranga, an Arena childhood acquaintance with no criminal connections, in the Mill Basin section of Brooklyn. After forcing Arena to stop the car, the gunmen shot and killed both men. However, till this day there is no concrete evidence that Corozzo ordered the murder of Robert Arena.

Florida arrest

In December, 1996, Corozzo was indicted in Miami, Florida on 20 racketeering charges that included attempted murder, arson, and loansharking. Corozzo was accused of running a loansharking business in Deerfield Beach, Florida that charged 260% yearly interest on loans. Federal agents arrested Corozzo as he emerged from the surf at a beach in Key Biscayne, Florida. In August 1997, Corozzo pleaded guilty to racketeering charges in Florida and was sentenced to five to ten years in prison. Later that year, Corrozo again pleaded guilty in Brooklyn to  racketeering and bribing a jail guard.

While in federal prison, Corozzo shared a cell with Gambino associate Joseph Vollaro, who was serving a drug conviction. After his release, Vollaro started paying tribute to Corozzo's crew on a trucking company he started. However, facing another drug conviction in 2004, Vollaro agreed to become a government informant and record his conversations with Corozzo.

After Corozzo's release from prison on June 10, 2004, it was expected he would again take over the Gambino crime family. However, due to increased law enforcement attention, he initially kept a low profile. The Gambinos were reportedly led by Jackie D'Amico until 2005. Corozzo kept his position as a Caporegime, despite health concerns and tight parole restrictions. In 2006, a new report stated that Nicholas Corozzo and D'Amico were the new bosses of the Gambino family, with Arnold "Zeke" Squitieri as underboss and Joseph Corozzo as consigliere.

Indictment and prison
In February 2008, Corozzo was indicted twice, one for the federal Operation Old Bridge and the other for the state Operation Touchback. The federal indictment was for the 1996 Arena and Maranga murders and other racketeering charges, with Vollaro as their main witness. The state indictment, prosecuted by Queens County District Attorney Richard A. Brown, Organized Crime and Rackets Bureau Chief Gerard A. Assistant District Attorney Benjamin J. Mantell, included the top count of enterprise corruption surrounding a Queens-based gambling ring that grossed almost $10 million over two years from sports betting.

Amid a roundup of 62 mobsters named in an indictment, Corozzo had fled his Long Island home. The FBI searched intensively for Corozzo and the television program America's Most Wanted did a feature on him. On May 29, 2008, after four months as a fugitive, Corozzo walked into the FBI's New York City office and surrendered.

In July 2008, Corozzo pleaded guilty to the state enterprise corruption charges. On April 17, 2009, Corozzo was sentenced to 13 and a half years in federal prison for the 1996 Arena and Maranga murders.

Corozzo was originally incarcerated at the United States Penitentiary, Leavenworth, a medium security facility in Leavenworth, Kansas, but was later moved to the Federal Correctional Complex, Florence, a high security facility in Florence, Colorado. As of March 2015, he was incarcerated at the Federal Correctional Institution, Loretto, a low security facility in Loretto, Pennsylvania. As of March 2018, Corozzo was imprisoned at the low security Federal Correctional Institution, Allenwood Low in Allenwood, Pennsylvania. His projected release date was March 2, 2020, but he was released early on November 29, 2019.

References

Further reading
Capeci, Jerry. The Complete Idiot's Guide to the Mafia. Indianapolis: Alpha Books, 2002. 
Raab, Selwyn. Five Families: The Rise, Decline, and Resurgence of America's Most Powerful Mafia Empires. New York: St. Martin Press, 2005. 
United States. Congress. Senate. Committee on Governmental Affairs. Permanent Subcommittee on Investigations. Organized Crime: 25 Years After Valachi: Hearings Before the Permanent Subcommittee on Investigations of the Committee on Governmental Affairs. 1988.

External links

Wanted: One boss for notorious crime family  by Tom Troncone
The One that Got Away... Caught! - WCBS 880

1940 births
People from Brownsville, Brooklyn
Acting bosses of the Five Families
American prisoners and detainees
Bosses of the Gambino crime family
Gambino crime family
American gangsters of Italian descent
Living people
American crime bosses
Inmates of ADX Florence
People from Bellmore, New York
People convicted of racketeering
People convicted of corruption